The Roman Catholic Diocese of Nashik is a diocese located in the city of Nashik in the Ecclesiastical province of Bombay in India.

History
 May 15, 1987: Established as Diocese of Nashik from the Roman Catholic Diocese of Poona

Leadership
 Bishops of Nashik (Latin Rite)
 Bishop Thomas Bhalerao, S.J. (15 May 1987 – 31 Mar 2007 )
 Bishop Valerian D'Souza (Apostolic Administrator 31 March 2007 – 16 January 2008)
 Archbishop Felix Anthony Machado (16 Jan 2008 - Nov 2009) [transferred to Vasai diocese, Nov 2009]
 Bishop Lourdes Daniel (Apostolic Administrator Nov 2009 - 11 Nov 2010)
 Bishop Lourdes Daniel (11 Nov 2010 - )

References

External links
 GCatholic.org 
 Catholic Hierarchy 

Roman Catholic dioceses in India
Christian organizations established in 1987
Roman Catholic dioceses and prelatures established in the 20th century
Christianity in Maharashtra
1987 establishments in Maharashtra
Nashik